Pritchardia forbesiana, the Mt. Eke pritchardia,  is a species of palm tree. It is endemic to the island of Maui in Hawaii. It grows in forests. Populations are recovering since the removal of destructive feral pigs.

References

External links
Pritchardia forbesiana. Native Plants Hawaii. University of Hawaii.

forbesiana
Trees of Hawaii
Endemic flora of Hawaii
Endangered plants
Biota of Maui
Taxonomy articles created by Polbot